Yangsan Station is the western terminus of the Busan Metro Line 2 located in Jungbu-dong, Yangsan, South Gyeongsang. The subname in parentheses is City Hall.

History 
 10 January 2008: The Busan Metropolitan Rapid Transit Line 2's Hopo Station-Yangsan Station (excluding Pusan Nat'l Univ. Yangsan Campus) is extended and opened as the terminating station.
 2010 October 18: Increased the number of train stops from 161 to 306 times.

See also 
 Dongwon Institute of Science and Technology

References

External links 
 Cyber station information from Busan Transportation Corporation 

Railway stations opened in 2008
Metro stations in Yangsan